Chionodes litigiosa is a moth in the family Gelechiidae. It is found in Ecuador.

The wingspan is 11–13 mm. The forewings are dark fuscous, variably irrorated with whitish-fuscous or whitish-ochreous. The stigmata are cloudy, blackish, with the plical slightly before the first discal and with a small cloudy pale ochreous or whitish-ochreous spot on the costa at three-fourths. The hindwings are grey.

References

Chionodes
Moths described in 1917
Moths of South America